Zemithang or Zimithang, also called Pangchen, is a village and the headquarters of an eponymous circle in the Tawang district of Indian state of Arunachal Pradesh. It is on the bank of the Nyamjang Chu river, which originates in Tibet and enters India from the north near the locality called Khinzemane.

The Zemithang Circle is the last administrative division of India on the border with the Tibet Autonomous Region of  China, along the border with Bhutan in the west.
It has a population of 2,498 people by the 2011 census, distributed in 18 villages. The Zemithang Circle and the Dudunghar Circle to its south, together make up a community development block.

Zemithang's border with Tibet, along the Namka Chu and Sumdorong Chu valleys, is disputed with China.

Gallery

References 

Tawang district
Borders of Arunachal Pradesh